Head Over Heels is the eighth studio album by the American country rock band Poco, and their first on ABC Records.  Timothy Schmit's "Keep On Tryin'" shows off the band's skills in harmonizing and eventually became a favorite that the band played in concert for many years. It also contains Rusty Young performing his first lead vocal on a Poco album on the track "Us", and a recording of the rare Steely Dan song "Dallas".

Reception

In his Allmusic review, music critic James Chrispell wrote; "Keeping the songs short and to the point, Poco lets loose with a fine batch of material... There's less country, but a lot more pop."

Track listing
"Keep on Tryin’" (Timothy B. Schmit) – 2:54
"Lovin’ Arms" (Rusty Young) – 3:29
"Let Me Turn Back to You" (Paul Cotton) – 3:37
"Makin’ Love" (Young) – 2:55
"Down in the Quarter" (Cotton) – 4:32
"Sittin’ on a Fence" (Young) – 3:31
"Georgia, Bind My Ties" (Cotton) – 3:25
"Us" (Young) – 1:56
"Flyin’ Solo" (Schmit, John Brennan) – 3:36
"Dallas" (Donald Fagen, Walter Becker) – 3:29
"I’ll Be Back Again" (Schmit) – 3:02

Personnel 

Poco
 Paul Cotton – acoustic guitar (1, 2, 3, 6-10), vocals (1-7, 9, 10, 11), electric guitar (3-11)
 Rusty Young – acoustic guitar (2, 3, 4, 6), banjo (2), dobro (2), pedal steel guitar (2-7, 10, 11), mandolin (3, 8), steel guitar (4, 6), electric guitar (6), vocals (8)
 Timothy B. Schmit – vocals (1-11), bass (2-11), percussion (6, 8)
 George Grantham – vocals (1-7, 9, 10, 11), drums (2-11), percussion (2, 4, 6)

Additional musicians
 Mark Henry Harman – pipe organ (3, 8), acoustic piano (8)
 Garth Hudson – acoustic piano (4)
 Victor Feldman – percussion (6, 10, 11)
 Al Garth – viola (2), violin (2), laugh (2)
 Jimmie Haskell – string arrangements (5, 10)
 Michael "Von" Verdick – scat vocal (6)

Production 
 Poco – producers, arrangements 
 Mark Henry Harman – producer, engineer 
 Michael "Von" Verdick – engineer 
 Wally Traugott – mastering 
 Llew Llewellyn – equipment
 Peter Whorf – art direction 
 Tim Bryant – design 
 Phil Hartman – design 
 Ron Slenzak – photography 
 Hartmann and Goodman – management

Studios
 Recorded at Record Plant (Los Angeles, California).
 Mixed at ABC Recording Studios (Los Angeles, California).
 Mastered at Capitol Mastering (Hollywood, California).

References

Poco albums
1975 albums
ABC Records albums